Ahmad Seddik Abdelhamid Mahdy (born August 16, 1983) is an Egyptian footballer. He is a very fast retired midfielder. He is a strong shooter.

He is not a regular in Al Ahly, but he took his advantage against Algerian JS Kabylie in his first African match, and displayed his evident class with a beautifully judged first-half free kick that represented his first goal for the club. Then, his shot just before half-time hit the upright but fell perfectly for Osama Hosny to make sure of the 2–0 triumph. This triumph was in the absence of injury victims Mohamed Aboutreika and Mohamed Barakat. This match writes the first line in Sedik's history, as it helped Al Ahly to retain its title and win CAF Champions League 2006. "1"

Honours 

Al-Ahly
 Bronze Medalist at FIFA Club World Cup 2006.
 Winner of African Super Cup (2009).
 Winner of African Super Cup (2007).
 Winner of CAF Champions League 2008.
 Winner of CAF Champions League 2006.
 Winner of Egyptian League (2008–2009).
 Winner of Egyptian League (2007–2008).
 Winner of Egyptian League (2006–2007).
 Winner of Egyptian Soccer Cup (2007).
 Winner of Egyptian Super Cup (2008).
 Winner of Egyptian Super Cup (2007).
 Winner of Egyptian Super Cup (2006).

References 

1 FIFA.com:Sedik inspires Al-Ahly revival

1983 births
Living people
Egyptian footballers
Association football defenders
Al Ahly SC players
Egyptian Premier League players